The decorations of Azad Hind were instituted by Subhas Chandra Bose while in Nazi Germany, initially for the Indian Legion, to be awarded for gallantry in the field of battle. Both Indians and Germans were eligible for the decorations. Later, the same awards were instituted by the Azad Hind provisional government for the Indian National Army during its campaign in South-East Asia.

Sher-e-Hind

The Grand Star "Sher-e-Hind" (Tiger of India), was a neck order/medal and could be conferred with swords for valour in combat, and without swords for non-combat awards. At least one award was made, to Captain Kunwal Singh.

Sardar-e-Jung

The second highest military decoration by the awarded by the Azad Hind Government was the Sardar-e-Jung (Leader of Battle), which was a 1st Class Star. The award was a Badge, and could be conferred with swords for valour in combat, and without swords for non-combat awards. At least two awards were made, one to Colonel Shaukat Hayat Malik for the capture of Moirang, and to Capt. Shangara Singh Mann. Capt. Mann was also awarded the Vir-e-Hind medal.

Vir-e-Hind

The Vir-e-Hind (Warrior of India) was the 2nd Class Star and third in order. This award was a medal, and like those higher than it, the award could be conferred with swords for valour in combat, and without swords for non-combat awards. At least one award was made, to Capt. Shangara Singh Mann. Capt. Mann was also awarded the Sardar-e-Jung.

Shahid-e-Bharat

The Shahid-e-Bharat (Martyr for India) was a medal to fallen soldiers. It was awarded in gold or in silver and was only awarded with swords.

Tamgha-e-Bahaduro

The soldier's medal.

See also
Former Indian National Army Monument

References

Indian National Army
Azad Hind